"Oh L'amour" is a song by English synthpop duo Erasure, released in April 1986 as their third single.

Written by Erasure members Vince Clarke and Andy Bell, it is a lament from someone experiencing unrequited love. The song is an uptempo, synthpop dance track and its popularity was further fueled in dance clubs by the "Funky Sisters Remix", which appeared on the UK 12-inch single and as a bonus track on the U.S. edition of Erasure's debut album Wonderland. A different mix of the song was submitted for the single release, adding new instrumentation and extra sounds. This version appears on all of the band's compilation albums. A version of the 12" single was included with early copies of the debut LP Wonderland. One of the B-sides is a cover version of "Gimme! Gimme! Gimme! (A Man After Midnight)", the first time Erasure covered a song from the ABBA songbook. It was issued by Mute Records in the UK and Sire Records in the U.S. to herald the June release of Wonderland, but became the third consecutive commercial failure for the band in both territories. Despite its low chart placing, "Oh L'amour" has proven to be one of Erasure's signature songs, due to its popularity in dance clubs. It remains a favourite among fans, particularly when performed live.

In 2003, the song was remixed and released as a single again to promote the greatest hits package Hits! The Very Best of Erasure. In its remixed form, the song became a UK Top 20 hit, peaking at number 13 in autumn 2003. The original artwork of the "Oh L'amour" single featured illustrations from The Railway Series of characters Percy and Rheneas. As permission had not been given, this cover was withdrawn and replaced with a plain black cover with only the title and band name.

Critical reception
Ned Raggett from AllMusic commented, "A lovely a cappella opening and instantly catchy hook, not to mention sprightly performances from Clarke and Bell both (the latter wisely undersings rather than pushing the flamboyance, letting loose more on the chorus), ensured its classic status." He also called it "brilliant", noting "the soothing jump" of the song. Chris Gerard from Metro Weekly described it as "the first truly great Erasure single", adding it as "an infectious dance/pop classic". Darren Lee from The Quietus noted "the effete hormonal cravings" of the song, stating that it is one of "the most gloriously effervescent pop anthems ever recorded."

Chart performance
In 1986, "Oh L'amour" climbed to number 85 on the UK Singles Chart and became Erasure's first big hit in South Africa (number two), in Germany (number 16), in Australia (number 13) and their only one in France (number 14). In the United States, the song's biggest impact was on the Hot Dance Music/Club Play chart, where it hit number three on 26 July 1986.

Track listings

Original release (1986)

 7" single (MUTE45)
 "Oh L'amour"
 "March on Down the Line"

 12" single (12MUTE45)
 "Oh L'amour" (12" Mix)
 "March on Down the Line" (12" Mix)
 "Gimme! Gimme! Gimme! (A Man After Midnight)"

 Limited 12" single (L12MUTE45)
 "Oh L'amour" (PWL Funky Sisters Say 'Ooh La La')
 "Gimme! Gimme! Gimme!" (Remix)
 "March on Down the Line" (Remix)

 12" US single (Sire 20488-0)
 "Oh L'amour" (The Funky Sisters Remix) 7:12
 "Gimme! Gimme! Gimme!" (12" Mix) 4:48
 "March on Down the Line" 6:04

 CD single (CDMUTE45)
 "Oh L'amour" 3:10
 "March on Down the Line" 3:45
 "Oh L'amour" (Re-mix) 5:58
 "March on Down the Line" (Remix) 6:05
 "Gimme! Gimme! Gimme!" (A Man After Midnight) 3:55

August Mix (2003)

 CD single (CDMUTE312)
 "Oh L'amour" (August Mix)
 "Love Me All Night Long"
 "Nothing Lasts Forever"

 Limited CD single (LCDMUTE312)
 "Oh L'amour" (LMC Extended Remix)
 "Oh L'amour" (Shanghai Surprize Remix)
 "Oh L'amour" (Kenny Hayes Remix)

 DVD single (DVDMUTE312)
 "Oh L'amour" (Carsten Kroeyer Mix)
 "Oh L'amour" (Dark Brothers and Andy Bell Mix)
 "Victim of Love" (video - Live Footage from The Other Tour)

 Download single (iMUTE312)
 "Oh L'amour" (Markymix) [Mark Towns]

Charts

Original release (1986)

Year-end charts

August Mix (2003)

Dollar version

In 1987, British pop duo Dollar released a cover version retitled "O L'amour". Chart-wise, this version was more successful in the UK as it reached No. 7 on the UK Singles Chart, with a total of 11 weeks on the chart, and No. 4 in Ireland. It also reached No. 27 in Germany. The single was the duo's last major hit.

It was sampled by electronic duo Orbital on their track "Style", which appeared on the 1999 album The Middle of Nowhere.

Track listing
UK 12" single
A. "O L'amour"
B1. "B-Beat"
B2. "Who Were You With in the Moonlight"

UK 7" single
 "O L'amour"
 "B-Beat"

Other versions
 A Hi-NRG/Eurotrance cover of the song by Spellbound, featuring Deejé, was released in 2000.
 A cover version by DJ Dero, featuring Alejandro Sergi (of the Argentine electropop band Miranda!), was recorded in 2007 and included on the dance music compilation Verano 2008.
 A cover version by Czech singer Petr Muk (alongside cover versions of "Love to Hate You", "Ship of Fools", "Stop!", and "Sometimes", all with Czech lyrics) was included on his EP Oh L'amour, released in 2004.

References

1986 singles
1987 singles
Erasure songs
Songs written by Vince Clarke
Songs written by Andy Bell (singer)
Song recordings produced by Flood (producer)
Mute Records singles
Dollar (band) songs
1986 songs
Sire Records singles